Eupithecia perigrapta is a moth in the  family Geometridae. It is found in South Africa.

References

Endemic moths of South Africa
Moths described in 1933
perigrapta
Moths of Africa